The Combat of the Giaour and Hassan is the title of three works by Eugène Delacroix, produced in 1826, 1835 and 1856. They all show a scene from Lord Byron's 1813 poem The Giaour, with the Giaour ambushing and killing Hassan, the Pasha, before retiring to a monastery. Giaour had fallen in love with Leila, a slave in Hassan's harem, but Hassan had discovered this and had her killed.

1826 version

In 1824, Delacroix recorded in his diary his experience of reading The Giaour and Childe Harold's Pilgrimage, probably in their 1819–1824 French translations by Amédée Pichot. His first version was presented to the Art Institute of Chicago in 1826 for an exhibition.

This version shows the Giaour and Hassan, both on horseback, fighting in a gorge. A Turk escorting Hassan kneels beside the Giaour's horse, trying to cut its legs with his knife.

1835 version
Now in the Petit Palais in Paris, the second version. Unlike the 1825 version, it focuses entirely on the two riders.

1856 version
This work is a variant of the two previous versions

References

Horses in art
Paintings by Eugène Delacroix
Orientalist paintings
Paintings in the collection of the Art Institute of Chicago
1826 paintings
1835 paintings
1856 paintings
Paintings in the collection of the Petit Palais